This is a list of South Korean films that have received or are due to receive a domestic theatrical release in 2010.

Box office
The highest-grossing South Korean films released in 2010, by domestic box office gross revenue, are as follows:

Released

See also
 List of 2010 box office number-one films in South Korea

References

External links
2010 in South Korea
2010 in South Korean music

 Korean Film Council website

Box
2010
South Korean